is a former Japanese football player.

Club statistics

References

External links

j-league

1988 births
Living people
Chuo University alumni
Association football people from Tokyo
Japanese footballers
J1 League players
J2 League players
Nagoya Grampus players
FC Gifu players
Association football defenders